Fort São Sebastião (Portuguese: Forte São Sebastião de Xama) located in Shama, Ghana, is the third oldest fortification in Ghana. Along with several other castles in Ghana, it was inscribed on the UNESCO World Heritage List in 1979 because of its testimony to the history of European trade, colonization, and exploitation in the region.

History 
It was built by the Portuguese from 1520 to 1526 as a trading post in and captured by the Dutch West India Company in 1642. The original purpose of the fort was to serve as a deterrent to English sailors interfering in Shama trade. The first black European university professor, Anton Wilhelm Amo, lies interred in the fort's graveyard. The fort was ceded with the entire Dutch Gold Coast to Britain in 1872.

During the time of the African Slave Trade, kidnapped Africans were imprisoned here while awaiting transport to North America.

3D documentation with terrestrial laser scanning 
The Zamani Project documented Fort San Sebastian in 2013, with terrestrial 3D laser scanning. The data generated by the non-profit research group creates a permanent record that can be used for research, education, restoration, and conservation.

A 3D model and a panorama tour, of Fort San Sebastian are available on www.zamaniproject.org. An animation of the 3D model is available here.

Gallery

References 

San Sebastian
Portuguese Gold Coast
Dutch Gold Coast
Western Region (Ghana)
Buildings and structures completed in 1526
1526 establishments in Africa
1526 establishments in the Portuguese Empire
16th century in Ghana
Castles in Ghana
Portuguese colonial architecture in Ghana